Trévières is a commune in the Calvados department in the Normandy region in northwestern France.

Administration
Trévières is the seat of the canton of Trévières which contains 59 communes. Trévières is part of the Communauté de communes Isigny-Omaha Intercom, which contains the same 59 communes and has its seat in Le Molay-Littry.

Population

Personalities
 Octave Mirbeau, writer, born in 1848

Twin towns 

 Stokeinteignhead, Devon, England

See also
Communes of the Calvados department

References

Communes of Calvados (department)
Calvados communes articles needing translation from French Wikipedia